Jiří Jakoubek (born 25 February 1960) is a Czech rower. He competed in the men's quadruple sculls event at the 1988 Summer Olympics.

References

1960 births
Living people
Czech male rowers
Olympic rowers of Czechoslovakia
Rowers at the 1988 Summer Olympics
Sportspeople from Brno